Cheshmeh Barani (also Romanized as Cheshmeh Bārānī; also known as Posht Bāgh-e Ẕarūnī) is a village in Kuhdasht-e Jonubi Rural District, in the Central District of Kuhdasht County, Lorestan Province, Iran. At the 2006 census, its population was 426, in 93 families.

References 

Towns and villages in Kuhdasht County